Kukuan Dam is a concrete thin arch dam on the Dajia River in Heping District, Taichung, Taiwan. The dam serves for hydroelectric power generation and flood control, and is the third in a cascade of hydroelectric dams on the Dajia River, being located below the Techi and Qingshan dams and upstream from the Tienlun Dam. The dam supplies water to a power station consisting of four 45 megawatt (MW) turbines for a total capacity of 180 MW, generating 507 million kilowatt hours per year.

See also

 List of power stations in Taiwan
 List of dams and reservoirs in Taiwan
 Electricity sector in Taiwan

References

1961 establishments in Taiwan
Arch dams
Dams in Taichung
Dams completed in 1961
Hydroelectric power stations in Taiwan